Robert William Abernathy (July 12, 1917 – September 2, 1997), also listed as James Abernathy,  was an American baseball outfielder in the Negro leagues. He played with the Kansas City Monarchs in 1945, the Indianapolis–Cincinnati Clowns in 1947, and the New York Cubans in 1948.

His career ended when he broke his leg in 1948 while trying to break his slide at home plate while scoring from third base.

References

External links
 and Baseball-Reference Black Baseball Stats and  Seamheads

Indianapolis Clowns players
Kansas City Monarchs players
New York Cubans players
1917 births
1997 deaths
Baseball players from Tennessee
Baseball outfielders
People from Maury County, Tennessee
20th-century African-American sportspeople
20th-century African-American people